Deborah Fleming (born 10 June 1991) is an English rugby sevens player.

Fleming began playing for Bristol Bears when she was 21 before moving to Saracens. She joined the England women's national rugby sevens team in 2017.

She won a bronze medal at the 2018 Commonwealth Games.

References

1991 births
Living people
England international rugby sevens players
Rugby sevens players at the 2018 Commonwealth Games
Commonwealth Games rugby sevens players of Australia
Commonwealth Games bronze medallists for Australia
Olympic rugby sevens players of Great Britain
Rugby sevens players at the 2020 Summer Olympics
England international women's rugby sevens players
Commonwealth Games medallists in rugby sevens
Medallists at the 2018 Commonwealth Games